Below are the squads for the Football at the 2011 Southeast Asian Games, hosted by Indonesia, which took place between 3 and 22 November 2011.

Group A

Indonesia 
Coach:  Rahmad Darmawan

Malaysia 
Coach:  Ong Kim Swee

Singapore 
Coach:  Fandi Ahmad

Thailand 
Coach:  Prapol Pongpanich

Cambodia 
Coach:  Lee Tae-Hoon

Group B

Vietnam 
Coach:  Falko Götz

Myanmar 
Coach:  Stefan Hansson

|}

Timor-Leste 
Coach:  Antonio Carlos Vieira

Laos 
Coach:  Hans-Peter Schaller

Brunei 
Coach:  Dayem Ali

Philippines 
Coach:  Michael Weiß

References 

Football at the 2011 Southeast Asian Games